Music examinations are a method of formally assessing the accomplishments of pupils learning musical instruments. These are called grades.

Although there are music examinations available to school and university students alongside other regular qualifications and assessments, there are also a number of independent bodies who solely provide assessment in musical ability which are open to all.

Overview
Trinity College London was the first organization to offer examinations in music to external students in 1877. As of 2018, Trinity College London conducts around 850,000 assessments worldwide per year, as does the Associated Board of the Royal Schools of Music. Other examination boards based in the UK include the London College of Music, Victoria College of Music and Drama, the National College of Music and Rockschool (RSL Awards).

Many students who enter these exams have taken a course of music lessons with a private tutor, although some are self-taught. Often this is a way for children to receive music training over and above what is provided at their usual place of learning, although private lessons are also popular with adults who turn to music later in life.

Music exams are set in both theory and practical aspects. The theory examinations are taken by pupils of all instruments and typically cover areas such as musical notation, harmony and composition.

The practical exams concentrate on the particular instrument favored by the pupil, for example piano, guitar or flute. Rockschool exams include electric guitar, acoustic guitar, bass, drums, ukulele and keyboards. They cover elements such as playing set pieces, technical work including scales, sight reading, aural, musical knowledge and improvisation.

In the United Kingdom the music exams are graded from 1 to 8, with Grade 1 being the entry level, and Grade 8 being the standard required for entry to higher study in a music college. Additionally, Trinity College London offers an Initial level qualification at Entry Level 3 of the UK Qualifications and Credit Framework, and ABRSM offer a Prep Test qualification as a useful preparation before the Grade 1 exam. LCM offers one Pre-preparatory and two Step exams at this level and VCM offers four Introductory grades aimed at those in the first 18 months of learning.

Other reputable music examination boards offering examinations on musical instruments and music theory include:
 Australian Guild of Music (Australia, South East Asia, Mexico, Africa)
 Australian Music Examinations Board
 The Royal Conservatory of Music (Canada)
 University of South Africa - Directorate Music
 ANZCA Music Examinations (Australia, New Zealand and Asia)
 New Zealand Music Examinations Board
 St.Cecilia School of Music
 Royal Irish Academy of Music
 Music Teachers' Board

Different music examination boards may have different grade levels for instruments and music theory examination. Depending on how they are recognised by regulatory bodies such as Ofqual, examination results or credits may be transferable from one exam board to the other.

References 

School examinations
Music education